Phi Eta Sigma is an American freshman honor society. Founded at the University of Illinois on March 22, 1923, it is the oldest and largest freshman honor society and has chartered three hundred and eighty-six chapters throughout the United States and inducted more than 1,250,000 members since its founding.

Eligibility
Any first-year student with a GPA of at least 3.5 on a 4.0 scale at the end of a full curricular period is eligible for membership, provided that student has taken normal academic coursework.  Once inducted, membership is conferred for life, and members are not required to maintain a 3.5 GPA. At certain universities, including Emory University, the minimum GPA is a 3.9 on a 4.0 scale.

Scholarships
Annually, Phi Eta Sigma provides $300,000 total in scholarships to members across the country. There are $1,000 awards and $5,000 scholarships for undergraduate study, as well as $7,000 scholarships for the first year of graduate study.  Members of Phi Eta Sigma must apply to receive these awards.

Phi Eta Sigma also awards the Thomas Arkle Clark Graduate Scholar Leader of the Year Endowed Scholarship, named in honor of the founder and first Grand President of Phi Eta Sigma.  This scholarship is a $10,000 award presented yearly to the member whom the Scholarship Committee determines to best exemplify the ideals of Phi Eta Sigma. In 2020, the first ever $10,000 James E. Foy - John W. Sagabiel Undergraduate Scholar Leader of the Year Award will be presented to an undergraduate student member of the society whom the Scholarship Committee determines to best exemplify the ideals of Phi Eta Sigma.

Publications
Phi Eta Sigma has two publications which it distributes to its members each year. The Forum is a magazine published each year containing updates of Phi Eta Sigma's activity, as well as announcements and biographies of scholarship recipients.  Hints on Studying and Learning is a popular pamphlet distributed by Phi Eta Sigma to its members.  It addresses effective study habits such as preparation for studying; productive reading, note taking, and memorizing skills; as well as suggestions for the successful preparation of term papers and preparing for exams.

National convention
Phi Eta Sigma organizes a biennial convention for its members, advisers, and special guests.  Attendee expenses, excluding transportation, are paid for by the national office for a chapter adviser and a student delegate from each chapter.  The most recent convention was held in 2018 in Washington, D.C.

Executive officers
The executive officers are elected at the biennial conventions.  The positions include national officers and executive committee advisers and students. They oversee the business of the society, and the national office staff manages general operations.

The current executive officers for the 2018–2020 term are:

Grand President: Mrs. Molly Lawrence, The University of Alabama
Grand President Emeritus: Dr. B.J. Alexander, Tarleton State University
Grand President Emeritus: Mr. John Harrell, Indiana University
Grand President Emeritus: Dr. John W. Sagabiel Western Kentucky University
Grand Vice President: Mr. Timothy A. Lemper, Esq., Indiana University
Grand Historian: Ms. Mary Jo Custer, Syracuse University
Executive Director: Dr. Mary Lee Caldwell, Phi Eta Sigma National Office
Executive Committee Members: Jennifer Miller, McKendree University; Mr. Tony Kemp, Mercer University; Mr. Alex Belisle, Boise State University
Student Executive Committee Members: Ms. Alyssa Kane IUPUI; Mr. Kody Klumb, University of Wisconsin-Green Bay; Mr. Kyle Klumb, University of Wisconsin-Green Bay; Michaela Mahekey, Georgia Southern University

List of universities with a present or former chapter

Region I (Northwestern United States except Wyoming)

Region II (California and Hawaii)

Region III (Southwestern United States)

Region IV (Midwestern United States except Minnesota)

Region V

Region VI

Region VII

Region VIII

Region IX (Mississippi Valley)

Region X (Southern United States)

Region XI

Region XII (Michigan)

Region XIII (Northeastern United States except New Hampshire)

Region XIV (Mid-Atlantic states)

Notes
1.Phi Eta Sigma at these institutions are coupled with Alpha Lambda Delta.
2.Gainesville State College merged into the University of North Georgia on January 8, 2013

References

External links
Phi Eta Sigma official site
Like Phi Eta Sigma on Facebook
Follow Phi Eta Sigma Tweets on Twitter

Student societies in the United States
Honor societies
1923 establishments in Illinois
Student organizations established in 1923
Association of College Honor Societies